Ligabueino (meaning "Ligabue's little one") is a genus of noasaurid dinosaur named after its discoverer, Italian doctor Giancarlo Ligabue. It is known only from an extremely fragmentary specimen, measuring 79 cm (2.6 ft) long, found in the La Amarga Formation. In spite of initial reports that it was an adult, the unfused vertebrae indicate that the specimen was a juvenile. It was a theropod and lived during the Early Cretaceous Period (Barremian to early Aptian), in what is now Patagonia. Contrary to initial classifications that placed it as a member of the Noasauridae, Carrano and colleagues found in 2011 that it could only be placed with any confidence in the group Abelisauroidea.

See also

 Timeline of ceratosaur research

References

Ceratosaurs
Aptian life
Barremian life
Early Cretaceous dinosaurs of South America
Cretaceous Argentina
Fossils of Argentina
La Amarga Formation
Fossil taxa described in 1996
Taxa named by José Bonaparte